Dirk Eddelbuettel is a Canadian statistician, data scientist and researcher. He is the author of the open-source software package Rcpp, written in the R programming language, and has also written the textbook Seamless R and C++ Integration with Rcpp on the topic. He is co-founder of the R In Finance Conference. In addition, he has contributed to many packages in R as well as the Debian project. He is also a co-creator of the Rocker Project bringing Docker to R.

Early life and education 
Eddelbuettel has an M.Sc in Industrial Engineering (Comp.Sci./OR) from Karlsruhe Institute of Technology in Germany. He received an M.A. and a PhD in Financial Econometrics from the School for Advanced Studies in the Social Sciences (EHESS) in France.

Career 
Eddelbuettel has been a contributor to CRAN for over a decade. He is the co-author/maintainer of more than sixty packages.  He is also the Debian/Ubuntu maintainer for R and other quantitative software, editor of the CRAN Task Views for Finance and High-Performance Computing, co-founder of the annual R/Finance conference, and an editor of the Journal of Statistical Software. He is a member of the R Foundation. and contributed to R-Hub.

Eddelbuettel has been interviewed by Data Science Los Angeles and others. He frequently gives talks to the R community.

He worked as a senior quantitative analyst from 2008 to 2012, and as a senior financial engineer from 2012 to 2018. Currently he is working as a principal software engineer in Chicago.

Eddelbuettel joined University of Illinois at Urbana-Champaign in 2018. He works as an adjunct Clinical Professor in Statistics where he created and teaches STAT 447: Data Science Programming Methods.

References

External links 
 
 R In Finance Conference

Living people
Year of birth missing (living people)
Place of birth missing (living people)
American statisticians
Scientists from Chicago
School for Advanced Studies in the Social Sciences alumni
Karlsruhe Institute of Technology alumni
Data scientists
Mathematicians from Illinois
R (programming language) people